is a professional Japanese baseball player. He plays infielder for the Yokohama DeNA BayStars.

References 

1994 births
Living people
Baseball people from Saitama Prefecture
Japanese baseball players
Nippon Professional Baseball infielders
Yokohama DeNA BayStars players